Mordellistena rayi is a species of beetle in the family Mordellidae. It was first described as Mordellistena humeralis in 1937 by Eugene Ray from Puerto Rico, but this name was preoccupied by Mordellistena humeralis (Linnaeus, 1758), and the replacement name Mordellistena rayi was created by Karl Ermisch in 1965.

This beetle measures  in length, or  when including the anal stylus.

References

rayi
Beetles of North America
Insects of Puerto Rico
Endemic fauna of Puerto Rico
Beetles described in 1965